St Hugh's Church, Foolow is a Grade II listed parish church in the Church of England in Foolow, Derbyshire.

History

The church was opened on 17 November 1888 The Chancel was added later and opened on 17 December 1889, The porch was a later addition.

Parish status

The church is in a joint parish with:
St. Anne's Church, Baslow
St Lawrence's Church, Eyam

Organ

The church contains a pipe organ by the Positive Organ Company. A specification of the organ can be found on the National Pipe Organ Register.

See also
Listed buildings in Foolow

References

Church of England church buildings in Derbyshire
Grade II listed churches in Derbyshire